Sexual Beast is an EP released by D'espairsRay on June 5, 2002. Brisk sales resulted in a reissue just one month after the initial pressing. While the first pressings of the album were housed in a digipak case featuring the painting The Execution of Lady Jane Grey. The reissue came in a single jewel case, and had different artwork of John the Baptist's head on a Platter.

Track listing

The name of the fourth song is printed as "Valentine" (ヴァレンタイン) in the booklet, but on the back of the album it is called "0214".
An early version of the song "Valentine" had been released on the Ura Mania Theater demo tape prior to the release of Sexual Beast.
 The tracks  and Furachi na Toiki to Amai Uso (不埒な吐息と甘い嘘) appear on the band's B-Side compilation album, Antique.

2002 EPs
D'espairsRay EPs